The third season of Chicago P.D., an American police drama television series with executive producer Dick Wolf, and producers Derek Haas, Michael Brandt, and Matt Olmstead, premiered on September 30, 2015, and concluded on May 25, 2016. The season contained 23 episodes.

Cast

Regular
 Jason Beghe as Sergeant Henry "Hank" Voight
 Jon Seda as Detective Antonio Dawson
 Sophia Bush as Detective Erin Lindsay
 Jesse Lee Soffer as Detective Jay Halstead
 Patrick John Flueger as Officer Adam Ruzek
 Marina Squerciati as Officer Kim Burgess
 LaRoyce Hawkins as Officer Kevin Atwater
 Amy Morton as Desk Sergeant Trudy Platt
 Brian Geraghty as Officer Sean Roman
 Elias Koteas as Detective Alvin Olinsky

Recurring
 Samuel Hunt as Greg "Mouse" Gerwitz
 Madison McLaughlin as Michelle Sovana
 Charisma Carpenter as Brianna Logan
 Markie Post as Barbara "Bunny" Fletcher
 Barbara Eve Harris as Deputy Chief/Commander Emma Crowley
 James McDaniel as Captain James Whitaker
 Kevin J. O'Connor as Commander Fischer
 Josh Segarra as Justin Voight
 Chris Agos as Assistant State's Attorney Steve Kot

Special guest
 Philip Winchester as Assistant State's Attorney Peter Stone
 Nazneen Contractor as Assistant State's Attorney Dawn Patel
 Joelle Carter as Investigator Laura Nagel
 Ryan-James Hatanaka as Investigator Daren Okada
 Lorraine Toussaint as Defense Attorney Shambala Green
 Carl Weathers as State's Attorney Mark Jefferies
 Clancy Brown as Eddie Little
 Andrea Susan Bush as Vikky

Crossover characters
 Mariska Hargitay as Lieutenant Olivia Benson
 Ice-T as Detective Fin Tutuola
 Nick Gehlfuss as Dr. Will Halstead
 Torrey DeVitto as Dr. Natalie Manning
 Rachel DiPillo as Sarah Reese
 Colin Donnell as Dr. Connor Rhodes
 Brian Tee as Dr. Ethan Choi
 S. Epatha Merkerson as Sharon Goodwin
 Oliver Platt as Dr. Daniel Charles
 Marlyne Barrett as Maggie Lockwood
 Taylor Kinney as Lieutenant Kelly Severide
 Monica Raymund as Firefighter Gabriela Dawson
 David Eigenberg as Firefighter Christopher Herrmann
 Yuri Sardarov as Firefighter Brian "Otis" Zvonecek
 Eamonn Walker as Battalion Chief Wallace Boden
 Joe Minoso as Firefighter Joe Cruz
 Christian Stolte as Firefighter Randy "Mouch" McHolland
 Steven R. McQueen as Candidate Jimmy Borelli
 Brian J White as Captain Dallas Patterson
 Randy Flagler as Firefighter Capp
 Anthony Ferraris as Firefighter Tony
 Andy Ahrens as Firefighter Danny Borelli

Episodes

Production
A three-way crossover between Chicago Fire, Chicago Med and Chicago P.D. aired on January 5 and 6, 2016. A crossover with Law & Order: Special Victims Unit aired on February 10, 2016, where Intelligence helps SVU track down Greg Yates after he escapes from prison in New York.

Ratings

Home media
The DVD release of season three was released in Region 1 on September 13, 2016.

References

External links

2015 American television seasons
2016 American television seasons
Chicago P.D. (TV series) seasons